Galt's Mill Complex is a national historic district located near Madison Heights, Amherst County, Virginia. It encompasses 21 contributing buildings, 1 contributing site, 8 contributing structures, and 1 contributing object associated with a rural mill village.  The buildings surround the masonry-constructed Galt's Mill, and are a variety of vernacular log or wood-frame structures.  The mill was built in 1813, and is a two-story, brick structures.  It was originally 5 1/5-stories, but lowered to its present height about 1950. The mill remained in operation until 1956. A store building was added about 1900.  Other notable resources include the Aqueduct, Train Bridge (c. 1838), Railroad (c. 1870), Boathouse (c. 1900), Home House (c. 1813), Miller's House (c. 1900), and Millrace and Dam Ruins (c. 1813 and 1914).

It was added to the National Register of Historic Places in 2009.

References

Grinding mills on the National Register of Historic Places in Virginia
Historic districts on the National Register of Historic Places in Virginia
Buildings and structures in Amherst County, Virginia
National Register of Historic Places in Amherst County, Virginia
Industrial buildings completed in 1813
Grinding mills in Virginia